The Mechi Bridge (Nepali: मेची पुल) is a bridge that connects Nepal from the Jhapa District to  the Darjeeling district in West Bengal, India. Built over Mechi River, this bridge is considered an Eastern Trade point between Nepal and India. It was inaugurated in January 2019.

Location 
Connecting Kakarbhitta Town and Panitanki Bazaar, this bridge is located at Jhapa District of Province No. 1, Nepal and Darjeeling district of West Bengal, India.

Construction
The Mechi Bridge was constructed by India's National Highways and Infrastructure Development Corporation Limited (NHIDCL) and the EPC contractor was Dineshchandra R. Agrawal Infracon Private Limited (DRA Infracon).

Connection with highways 
The Mechi Bridge connects National Highway 327B and Mahendra Highway, which are also part of Asian Highway (AH2).

See also 
 Mahakali Bridge
 Karnali Bridge
 Narayani Bridge
 Sankhamul Bridge
 Sino-Nepal Friendship Bridge

References 

Bridges completed in 2019
Bridges in Nepal
2019 establishments in Nepal
Buildings and structures in Jhapa District